Ellen Kandeler (born 16 June 1957, in Berlin) is a German biologist and agricultural scientist specialising in soil biology at University of Hohenheim. She also heads the Soil Biology area in the EU Biofector project.

Life and work 
After leaving school in Vienna in 1975 Kandeler studied biology at the University of Vienna and obtained a diploma in 1979. She then attained a doctorate in chemical plant physiology in 1983 at the same university, and afterwards worked as a scientific assistant at the State Institute of Soil Science in Vienna (1983 to 1995) and as a university lecturer at the Institute of Soil Science and Engineering Geology at the Zoological Institute at Vienna University (1987 to 1998). In parallel, she received habilitation with  Venia legendi for the area of soil biology at the Vienna University of Soil Science in Vienna and took over as leader of Soil Microbiology Department and the Research Centre at the State Office of Agriculture in Vienna (1995 to 1998). She also became deputy to the Professor of Soil Biology and Ecology at the Agricultural Faculty of Halle-Wittenberg University. In 1998 Kandeler was invited to take up a Professorship in the area of soil biology at the Institute of Soil Science at Hohenheim University.

Main fields of research 
Soil microbiology; microbial ecology; soil ecology
Teaching emphasis: Deputy Head of the area soil biology for  B.Sc., M.Sc. and Diploma students in the fields of Agricultural Science, Agricultural Biology and Biology; Geo- and Eco-Microbiology; Molecular Soil Microbiology; Biology of Soil Biochemistry; Biology of the Rhizosphere
Managing Director of the Institute of Soil Science and member of the Faculty Board and the Large Instrument Commission (2000–2002)

Memberships 
International Soil Science Society
Society of German Agricultural Inspection and Research Institutes (VDLUFA)
German Soil Science Society    
Soil Science Society of America

Publications (selection) 
List of publications by Ellen Kandeler on the web pages of Hohenheim University

Literature 
Ulrich Fellmeth: Ellen Kandeler im Hohenheimer Professorenlexikon; Die akademischen Lehrer an der Universität Hohenheim 1968 - 2005 (mit K. Quast), Stuttgart Seite 218 f.

References

External links 
 Research Projects Ellen Kandeler
 

Living people
20th-century German biologists
20th-century German chemists
1957 births
21st-century German chemists
Academic staff of the University of Hohenheim